The United States Navy Mk 12 MOD 0/1/H Special Purpose Rifle (SPR) is a designated marksman rifle that was in service with United States Special Operations Forces in the designated marksman role until 2017, also designed to be shorter than standard weapons. SPR initially stood for Special Purpose Receiver as it referred to an add-on upper receiver assembly (part of the proposed SOPMOD upgrades), but that nomenclature changed to Special Purpose Rifle as the weapon became a stand-alone weapons system.

The SPR was eventually type-classified by the U.S. Navy as the Mk 12. The weapon was developed by the Naval Surface Warfare Center Crane Division for US special operations units, not for Navy units in general.

History
The SPR, used by Special Operations Forces of both the U.S. Army and U.S. Navy, is a heavily modified light designated marksman variation of the M16 line of infantry weapons, chambered for NATO standard 5.56×45mm ammunition.The rifle is designed to fire semi-automatically, although it has the option to fire in full auto in case of emergencies.

The SPR concept was originally proposed by Mark Westrom, president of ArmaLite, while working at Rock Island Arsenal in 2000. The program was an outgrowth of the desire by both US Army and Navy special operations forces for a rifle with greater effective range than an M4 carbine but shorter than an SR-25. The SPR program appears to have grown out of both the SOPMOD Block II program, and the U.S. Navy SEALs Recon Rifle, a 16" flat-topped M16 carbine. Early models included the SPR, SPR/A, and SPR/B. The Naval Surface Warfare Center, Crane Division expanded on the Recon Rifle.

The USMC used the rifle towards the end of the war in Iraq and extensively in Afghanistan. In mid-2011, SOCOM began removing the Mk 12 SPR from their inventory and replacing it with the marksman version of the SCAR Mk 17, with the Mk 12 to be completely replaced by 2017.

Design

Upper receiver
The majority of the SPR upper receivers were initially supplied by Colt, with others being produced by Diemaco (now Colt Canada). Colt had been outsourcing parts of its production to Diemaco for several years, then purchased Diemaco in February 2005. It is unclear whether the upper receivers for the later SPRs came solely from ArmaLite, or were a mix of receivers from ArmaLite and Colt/Diemaco. All of these upper receivers are flat-topped, but have been seen with either the old-style teardrop forward assist or the newer round style.

Lower receiver
When the SPR program was still just an upper receiver assembly (and not a complete rifle), Crane assembled all of its prototypes using either M16A1 or M4A1 lower receivers, because the full auto trigger group in these lower receivers provided a consistent pull while the more common 3-round burst trigger groups didn't. While a number of trigger options were tried in the end, the Knight's Armament Company (KAC) 2-stage trigger was finally decided upon as the standard. Most of the obsolete M16A1 lower receivers were turned into NSWC Crane for disposal.

Barrel
An 18-inch (457 mm) (MOD 0/1) or 16-inch (406 mm) (MOD H) threaded-muzzle match-grade free floating stainless steel heavy barrel with a 1:7 (178 mm) rifling twist ratio is standard for the SPR. The barrels are manufactured by Douglas Barrels with a unique contour that reduced weight but maintained rigidity for accuracy. An OPS Inc. muzzle brake and collar (to align the OPS Inc. 12th Model Suppressor) is installed with the barrel. These barrels were designed to take advantage of the new Mk 262 cartridge, which uses a 77-grain (5 g) bullet.

Stock
SPRs have been seen with M16A1 or M16A2 fixed buttstocks, telescoping M4 buttstocks, and the Crane Enhanced telescoping buttstock. The rifles are compatible with any type of stock system developed for the M16.

Handguards
In all cases a free-floating forearm is used, which does not touch the barrel directly. This increases the accuracy of the weapon by removing vibration and pressure exerted on the barrel by the rest of the gun. The first SPRs used PRI Gen I or Gen II carbon-fiber free-float tubes. The SPR/A, SPR/B, and MK 12 MOD 1 all use the Knights Armament Company M4 Match Free-Floating Rail Adapter System, KAC part number 99167. The Mk 12 MOD 0/H uses PRI Gen III free-float tubes. The Gen I and Gen II Freefloat Forearms are combined with the Atlantic Research Marketing Systems #38 SPR MOD Sleeve, while the Gen III Freefloat Forearm, due to its it larger barrel nut, only works with the ARMS #38 SPR PEQ-2-3.

Accessories
The original SPR used an early PRI flip-up front sight with an elevation dial, which has since been discontinued. The Mk 12 MOD 0/H uses the current PRI flip-up front sight. The SPR/A, SPR/B, and Mk 12 MOD 1 use the KAC rail forend flip-up front sight, KAC part number 99051. The SPR and Mk 12 MOD 0/H use the ARMS #40 flip up rear sight. The rest of the models use the KAC 600 meter flip up rear, KAC part number 98474.

Due to the relative modularity of the system, optics (as well as almost everything else) can be mounted according to the operator's wishes. However, SPRs are most often seen with a 3.5–10×40 mm Leupold LR M3 (SPR/A), a 2.5–8×36 mm TS-30 (SPR/B), or a 3–9×36 mm TS-30 A2 (Mk 12 MOD 0/1) Mid Range/Tactical Illuminated Reticle Dayscope. Night vision devices can also be attached. These scopes usually come with flip open dust covers and a honeycomb anti-glare anti-reflection device. Given Nightforce Optics' NAVSPECWAR contract, it is believed that many NAVSPECWAR issued SPRs will use the Nightforce 2.5-10x42 NXS scope.

A long accessory rail, called a Swan Sleeve (ARMS SPR MOD or ARMS #38 SPR PEQ-2-3), manufactured by ARMS, is installed, running the length of the rifle. The SPR/A and SPR/B both used the KAC M4 Match FF RAS, KAC part number 99167. Two ARMS #22 Throwlever 30 mm steel rings are used to mount the dayscope. The SPR/A, SPR/B, and Mk 12 MOD 1 use ARMS #22 high rings, while due to the increased height from the SWAN Sleeve, the SPR and Mk 12 MOD 0/H use ARMS #22 medium rings. An under-the-handguard ARMS #32 Throwlever mount is used to mount the Harris bipod (the ARMS #42 Throwlever mount is used to mount the Versa-Pod); this features a quick release action. Nightforce Ultralite 1.375" rings were also alternate issued rings, primarily with Nightforce riflescopes from Crane.

Originally the relatively expensive Parker-Hale swivel bipods were used, but were taken off the system after the initial SPR. Currently, a Harris swivel model bipod is typically used with the SPR, and is sometimes seen with a KMW Pod-Loc tension adjustment device. As mentioned above, the bipod is mounted via an ARMS #32 throwlever device attached to the bottom rail of the rifle's forearm. The ARMS mount is used on both the MOD 0 and MOD 1.

The OPS Inc. 12th Model SPR Muzzle Brake Suppressor threads directly onto the OPS Inc. muzzle brake and uses the collar to stay centered for Mk 12 MOD 0/1 models. In 2014, Ops, Inc stopped manufacturing this model of suppressors. The equivalent product is currently manufactured by Allen Engineering Co as the AEM5. The AEM5 is essentially the same suppressor design and actually built by the same individual, Ron Allen, who previously fabricated the 12th model suppressor for Ops, Inc. Other models of this suppressor are also produced that look the same from the outside, but are fundamentally different suppressors.

Ammunition

The SPR is not used to fire standard issue 5.56mm M855A1, M193 ball, or M856 tracer ammunition. Due to the limits in terminal performance and relatively poor accuracy of the 62-grain (4 g) M855 ball, the Mk 262 Open Tip Match (OTM) round was developed and manufactured by Black Hills Ammunition as a more accurate round for the SPR. The first production batches were designated Mk 262 MOD 0 and used a Sierra MatchKing 77-grain (5 g) Hollow Point Boat Tail bullet without a cannelure (crimping groove). Black Hills then approached the Nosler bullet manufacturing company, who made a similar  OTM bullet, and Nosler agreed to supply cannelured bullets to Black Hills.

The newer load was designated Mk 262 MOD 1. Recently, Sierra added a minimal cannelure to its bullet, and this has since replaced the Nosler bullet in the current versions of Mk 262 MOD 1. In late 2014, Sierra introduced a tipped version of this bullet which adds a polymer tip to improve ballistics. This new bullet was found exclusively in an upgraded version of the Black Hills Ammo MK262 MOD 1 loading,  but this bullet has been released by Sierra to reloaders prior to the end of 2014. The Sierra part number for this bullet is 7177.

Gallery

See also
 M110 Semi-Automatic Sniper System
 United States Army Squad Designated Marksman Rifle
 U.S. Marine Corps Squad Advanced Marksman Rifle
 U.S. Marine Corps Designated Marksman Rifle

References

5.56×45mm NATO semi-automatic rifles
Designated marksman rifles
Sniper rifles of the United States
ArmaLite AR-10 derivatives
Military equipment introduced in the 2000s